Scott Hastings may refer to:

Scott Hastings (baseball) (1847–1907), American baseball player
Scott Hastings (basketball) (born 1960), American basketball player
Scott Hastings (rugby union) (born 1964), Scottish rugby player

See also
Hastings (name)